Fothad, later Fothadh, is an Old Irish and Scottish Gaelic male given name, meaning "foundation". Bearers include:

Saint Fothad, 8th century bard and cleric
Fothad Cairpthech and Fothad Airgthech, legendary joint High Kings of the 3rd century
Fothad I of Cennrígmonaid, 10th century Scottish supposed bishop
Fothad II of Cennrígmonaid, 11th century Scottish bishop

References

Irish-language masculine given names
Scottish masculine given names